No Thanks, I'm on a Diet is an Australian television sitcom which first screened on the ABC in 1976. It starred real life husband and wife Maurie Fields and Val Jellay, who play the parents of Brenda, who has a weight problem. The series revolves around her unsuccessful attempts to place less strain on the bathroom scales.

Cast
 Maurie Fields as Maurie
 Val Jellay as Val
 Berrie Cameron-Allen as Brenda

See also
 List of Australian television series

References

External links
 
 No Thanks, I'm on a Diet at Classic Television Australia

1976 Australian television series debuts
1976 Australian television series endings
1960s Australian television series
Australian television sitcoms
Australian Broadcasting Corporation original programming
English-language television shows